Abaciscus paucisignata is a species of moth belonging to the family Geometridae. It was described by Warren in 1899. It is known from Peninsular Malaysia and Borneo.

The habitat consists of alluvial forest, lower montane forest and lowland dipterocarp forest.

References

Boarmiini
Moths described in 1899
Moths of Asia